National Film Development Corporation may refer to:
 National Film Development Corporation of India (NFDC)
 National Film Development Corporation Malaysia (FINAS)